Arantxa Ramos Placensia (born 9 September 1988 in Barakaldo) is a Spanish swimmer who competed in the 2004 Summer Olympics and in the 2008 Summer Olympics.

Notes

References

External links
 
 
 
 

1988 births
Living people
Spanish female freestyle swimmers
Olympic swimmers of Spain
Swimmers at the 2004 Summer Olympics
Swimmers at the 2008 Summer Olympics
Mediterranean Games silver medalists for Spain
Mediterranean Games medalists in swimming
Swimmers at the 2005 Mediterranean Games
21st-century Spanish women